Gregory “G. G.” Jackson II (born December 17, 2004) is an American college basketball player for the South Carolina Gamecocks of the Southeastern Conference (SEC).

Early life and high school
Jackson grew up in Columbia, South Carolina and attended Ridge View High School. As a sophomore, he averaged 15.8 points and 10 rebounds as Ridge View won the South Carolina Class 5A State Championship. Jackson was named the South Carolina Basketball Gatorade Player of the Year after averaging 22.1 points, 10.9 rebounds, and 2.3 blocks per game and leading the Blazers to a second straight state title in his junior season.

Recruitment
Jackson was rated a five-star recruit and was the consensus best collegiate prospect for the 2023 recruiting class. He initially committed to play college basketball at North Carolina (UNC) shortly after the conclusion of his junior season after considering offers from Auburn, Duke, Georgetown, and South Carolina. Jackson later decommitted from UNC, becoming the first player to do so since J. R. Smith in 2003. He ultimately reclassified to the class of 2022 and enrolled at South Carolina. Jackson's commitment made him the highest-ranked recruit in school history.

College career
Jackson entered his freshman season at South Carolina as the Gamecocks' starting power forward. He was named the Southeastern Conference (SEC) Freshman of the Week for the first week of the season after averaging 15 points and nine rebounds in his first two career games. Jackson was benched after shooting 0–8 and scoring no points in an 85-42 loss to Tennessee. In the following game he scored 16 points off the bench in a 71-68 win over Kentucky. Jackson finished the season as the Gamecocks' leading scorer with 15.4 points per game.

National team
Jackson played for the United States under-18 basketball team at the 2022 FIBA Under-18 Americas Championship.

References

External links
South Carolina Gamecocks bio

2004 births
Living people
American men's basketball players
Basketball players from South Carolina
Power forwards (basketball)
South Carolina  Gamecocks men's basketball players
Sportspeople from Columbia, South Carolina